Wells Township may refer to the following places:

 Wells Township, Appanoose County, Iowa
 Wells Township, Marshall County, Kansas
 Wells Township, Delta County, Michigan
 Wells Township, Marquette County, Michigan
 Wells Township, Tuscola County, Michigan
 Wells Township, Rice County, Minnesota
 Wells Township, Wells County, North Dakota
 Wells Township, Jefferson County, Ohio
 Wells Township, Blaine County, Oklahoma
 Wells Township, Bradford County, Pennsylvania
 Wells Township, Fulton County, Pennsylvania
 Wells Township, Perkins County, South Dakota

There is also: Dry Wells Township, Nash County, North Carolina

See also

Wells (disambiguation)

Township name disambiguation pages